Rranxë  may refer to:

 Rranxë, Shkodër
 Rranxë, Durrës